Hylic (from Greek   (hylē) "matter") is the opposite of psychic (from Greek  (psychē) "soul").

In the gnostic belief system, hylics, also called somatics (from Greek  (sōma) "body"), were the lowest order of the three types of human. The other two were the psychics and the pneumatics (from Gk  (pneuma) "spirit, breath"). So humanity comprised matter-bound beings, matter-dwelling souls and the matter-free or immaterial spirits.

Somatics were deemed completely bound to matter. Matter, the material world, was considered evil by the gnostics. The material world was created by a demiurge, in some instances a blind, mad God, in others an army of rebellious angels as a trap for the spiritual Ennoia. The duty of (spiritual) man was to escape the material world by the aid of the hidden knowledge (gnosis).

Somatics were human in form, but since their entire focus was on the material world, such as eating, sleeping, mating or creature comforts, they were seen as doomed. The pneumatic saw himself as escaping the doom of the material world via the secret knowledge. Somatics were thought to be incapable of understanding.

For consideration of these dynamics, see for example the Gospel of Judas, believed to be a gnostic text, where Jesus is posited as a pneumatic and the other disciples, non-gnostics, as somatics .

See also
Id, ego and super-ego

References

Gnosticism